Greece has over 1,000 radio stations operating with a certificate of temporary legality. Most broadcast on the FM band; the AM band has been almost entirely abandoned by broadcasters, with the exception of State-run media and a few other stations.

In March 2001, the Greek government closed approximately 60 of 90+ FM stations operating in the Athens area, citing potential interference to frequencies to be used by the new Athens International Airport. There are some who believe that the government shut down these stations as a political favor to powerful publishing and media groups, whose stations, for the most part, remained on the air; others argued that the licensing process was legally inconsistent.

The Greek broadcast licensing process came under legal scrutiny as a result, and in 2002, eight of the closed stations reopened. In 2004 and 2005, several more stations reopened as the result of a judicial order. Stations have continued to open since then. Most of them are unlicensed and lack legal permission to broadcast; many of these stations were among those shut down by the Greek government in 2001. Throughout the country, no radio station is operating with a formal license as of March 2019; instead, stations are operating with temporary permits of legality with no expiration date, or simply operate without any legal status whatsoever.

The following is a list of major FM stations in Greece; this list is being upgraded.

Radio stations in Attica
Most stations in Athens broadcast from Mount Ymittos to the east of the city (but west of the Athens International Airport in Spata). A smaller minority of stations operate from Mount Parnitha, northwest of the city, or Mount Aigaleo, bordering the west of the city. Many stations also have repeaters on the island of Aegina, south of Athens in the Saronic Sea, to cover coastal regions of Athens, including Glyfada and Vouliagmeni, which due to the topography of the region, cannot receive clear signals from the other locations.

Most stations broadcast in stereo and several employ the Radio Data System technology. Most stations also broadcast with wattage ranging from 2 kW to 15–30 kW; official data on this is not made publicly available. Currently, 44 private radio stations are legally permitted to broadcast in Athens, in addition to the state radio broadcast stations. Focus Bari was chosen as the official company to measure audience listening data and ratings for stations in the Athens region. Previous to that, Focus Bari had been one of several companies tracking audience ratings.

Radio stations in Thessaloniki
In the Thessaloniki region a licensing bid for 27 FM frequencies has been on hold for several years, while engineering studies have shown that up to 19 more radio stations could possibly broadcast safely in the region, though how many if any, additional frequencies will be tendered remains uncertain.

Most radio stations in Thessaloniki broadcast from Mount Chortiatis, slightly northeast of the city. A very small minority broadcast from or have repeaters in other points throughout the region. Most stations broadcast in stereo, but a small (but slowly growing) number uses the Radio Data System. Like in Athens, most stations use excessively high wattage. Temporarily, most, but not all, stations are broadcasting with legal "permission" from Greek National Council for Radio and Television, until and if new licenses are issued.

Radio stations in the Aegean islands

Prefecture of Chios

Prefecture of Cyclades

Prefecture of Dodecanese

Prefecture of Lesbos

Prefecture of Samos

Radio stations in the Ionian islands

Prefecture of Corfu

Prefecture of Kefallinia

Prefecture of Lefkada

Prefecture of Zakynthos

Radio stations in the Peloponnese

Prefecture of Achaia

Prefecture of Argolis

Prefecture of Arcadia

Prefecture of Ilia

Prefecture of Korinthia

Prefecture of Lakonia

Prefecture of Messinia

Radio stations in Central Greece

Prefecture of Aitoloakarnania

Prefecture of Evia

Prefecture of Evrytania

Prefecture of Fokida

Prefecture of Fthiotida

Prefecture of Viotia

Radio stations in Crete

Prefecture of Chania

Prefecture of Heraklion

Prefecture of Lasithi

Prefecture of Rethymno

Radio stations in Epirus

Prefecture of Arta

Prefecture of Ioannina

Prefecture of Preveza

Prefecture of Thesprotia

Radio stations in Macedonia

Prefecture of Chalkidiki

Prefecture of Drama

Prefecture of Florina

Prefecture of Grevena

Prefecture of Imathia

Prefecture of Kastoria

Prefecture of Kavala

Prefecture of Kilkis

Prefecture of Kozani

Prefecture of Pella

Prefecture of Pieria

Prefecture of Serres

Radio stations in Thessaly

Prefecture of Karditsa

Prefecture of Larissa

Prefecture of Magnesia

Prefecture of Trikala

Radio stations in Thrace

Prefecture of Evros

Prefecture of Rodopi

Prefecture of Xanthi

Medium Wave (MW band)
On the AM band, there are few licensed stations left, all of which are state-run. Unlicensed broadcasting is tolerated as the majority of listeners have abandoned the MW band. A number of unlicensed radio stations have taken advantage of that, thus avoiding the "crowded" FM band. A number of pirate radio enthusiasts use the expanded upper part of the AM band (1600–1710 kHz) for "experimental" transmissions. When MW pirate radio broadcasting occurred, there was a formal division between the AM and FM, in Athens and Thessaloniki. On the MW/AM band most radio pirates in Athens were broadcasting foreign music (pop and rock) whereas in FM most radio pirates broadcast Greek popular music. In Thessaloniki, and most of the rest of Greece, on MW/AM pirates were playing Greek popular music, and foreign pop and rock on FM. Currently, with several exceptions, nearly all MW/AM radio pirates play Greek popular music to a limited audience.

In Athens
All the state-run radio stations still broadcast their programs on the MW band, except the Third Programme which gave its frequency (666 kHz) to an ERA Filia (Friendship) which has been suspended since 2013. The program is shared with another state station Kosmos. Since unlicensed broadcasting on the AM in Greece is illegal but tolerated, some pirate radio stations broadcast full-fledged radio programs, some with commercials and some experimental. An example is on 1098 kHz, broadcasting experimentally in C-QUAM, AM Stereo, one of the few AM Stereo radio stations in Europe. Other unlicensed radio stations on the MW include those on 909 kHz, 1017 kHz, 1035 kHz and 1188 kHz.

In Thessaloniki
The two official state-run radio programmes still broadcast their programmes on the MW: the first programme of the Radio Station of Macedonia on 1044 kHz and the second programme on 1179 kHz (simulcasting along with their FM services). A notable unlicensed radio station in Thessaloniki is the 1431AM, a free radio station broadcasting regularly from the Aristotle University of Thessaloniki campus in the centre of the city. Other pirate radio stations in the Thessaloniki area are using the 1566 kHz and the AM expanded band (1600–1710).

The rest of Greece
State-run ERA radio stations broadcast the ERA International Network programme to the Mediterranean and south-east Europe on 765 kHz (ERT Ioannina), 927 kHz (ERT Zakynthos), 1008 kHz (ERT Corfu), 1260 kHz (ERT Rhodes), 1404 kHz (ERT Komotini) and 1512 kHz (ERT Chania) in Greek. Other regional radio stations still broadcast in AM their programs (ERA National network), such as Kavala and Kozani on the same frequency (1602 kHz) and Heraklion Crete (954 kHz). Numerous pirate stations, many of them high powered, broadcast irregularly throughout Greece. Most are from the central-northern part of the country (Thessaly, West, and Central Macedonia) but there are AM radio pirates in Thrace, Crete, Cyclades and Peloponnese as well. On the AM expanded band (1600–1710) numerous radio pirates transmit experimentally without a regular schedule, or program, mostly Greek popular music along with Q code QSO.

Ionian Islands

Peloponnese

Macedonia

Thessaly

Komotini

Ioannina

Agrafa

Chania

Short Wave (SW band)

Digital and Internet Radio
Occasional experimental DAB broadcasts were reported in the Athens and Thessaloniki areas on channels 13A, 13B, 13C since 2003. Since January 2018, ERT transmits a DAB+ multiplex on channel 12C (227.360 MHz) from their transmitter site on Mount Ymittos, near Athens. The multiplex contains: "First Programme", "Second Programme", "Third Programme", "ERA Sport", "ERA Kosmos", "Voice of Greece" and "Zeppelin". Most radio stations in Greece stream their audio on the Internet.

List of digital radio stations

List of internet radio stations

Defunct stations
Global Greek Radio
You FM (Greece)

See also
List of Internet radio stations
List of Greek-language television channels
Lists of radio stations in Europe (this list only includes international stations i.e. NRG)

External links
GreekRadios.gr A catalog of all radio stations broadcasting online from Greece.
Radiofono.gr Frequency listings of Greek and Cypriot Radio and Television stations, plus live Greek radio and television broadcasts.
24htv.eu A catalog of live Greek radio and television broadcasts.
GreekRadio.ru Catalog of Greek radio stations with filtering by genre.

Lists of mass media in Greece
Greece
Radio stations in Greece
Greek-language radio stations